Aike González is a Spanish sprint canoer who competed in the early first decade of the 21st century. He won three medals at the ICF Canoe Sprint World Championships with a silver (K-4 200 m: 2002) and two bronzes (K-4 200 m: 2003, K-4 500 m: 2002).

References 

Living people
Spanish male canoeists
Year of birth missing (living people)
ICF Canoe Sprint World Championships medalists in kayak